Megachile iheringi is a species of bee in the family Megachilidae. It was described by Schrottky in 1913.

References

Iheringi
Insects described in 1913